The following is an alphabetical list of topics related to the former nation of the Netherlands Antilles.

0–9

.an – Internet country code top-level domain for the Netherlands Antilles

A
ABC islands
Adjacent country:

Air Force of the Netherlands Antilles
Americas
North America
North Atlantic Ocean
West Indies
Caraïbische Zee (Caribbean Sea)
Antillen (Antilles)
Kleine Antillen (Lesser Antilles)
ABC Islands
Aruba
Bonaire
Curaçao
Klein Bonaire
Klein Curaçao
SSS Islands
Saba
Sint Eustatius
Sint Maarten (Saint Martin)
Antillenhuis, the cabinet of the minister plenipotentiary of the Netherlands Antilles in the Hague
Antilles
Army of the Netherlands Antilles
Atlantic Ocean
Atlas of the Netherlands Antilles

B
BES Islands — a genuine abbreviation for the islands of Bonaire, Sint Eustatuis, and Saba

C

Capital of the Netherlands Antilles: Willemstad on Curaçao
Caribbean
Caribbean Netherlands (the BES Islands as separate from Curaçao and Sint Maarten)
Caribbean Community (CARICOM)
Caribbean Sea
Categories:
:Category:Netherlands Antilles
:Category:Bonaire
:Category:Curaçao
:Category:Saba (island)
:Category:Sint Eustatius
:Category:Sint Maarten
:Category:Communications in the Netherlands Antilles
:Category:Dutch Antillean culture
:Category:Dutch Antillean people
:Category:Economy of the Netherlands Antilles
:Category:Education in the Netherlands Antilles
:Category:Environment of the Netherlands Antilles
:Category:Geography of the Netherlands Antilles
:Category:Government of the Netherlands Antilles
:Category:History of the Netherlands Antilles
:Category:Netherlands Antilles stubs
:Category:Netherlands Antilles-related lists
:Category:Politics of the Netherlands Antilles
:Category:Society of the Netherlands Antilles
:Category:Sport in the Netherlands Antilles
:Category:Transport in the Netherlands Antilles
commons:Category:Netherlands Antilles
Cities of the Netherlands Antilles
Climate of the Netherlands Antilles
Coast guard – Netherlands Antilles & Aruba Coast Guard
Coat of arms of the Netherlands Antilles
Constitution of the Netherlands Antilles

D
Demographics of the Netherlands Antilles
Divi-divi
Dutch colonization of the Americas
Dutch language

E
Economy of the Netherlands Antilles
Elections in the Netherlands Antilles
English language

F

Flag of the Netherlands Antilles

G
Geography of the Netherlands Antilles
Government of the Netherlands Antilles

H
History of the Netherlands Antilles

I
International Organization for Standardization (ISO)
ISO 3166-1 alpha-2 country code for the Netherlands Antilles: AN
ISO 3166-1 alpha-3 country code for the Netherlands Antilles: ANT
Internet in the Netherlands Antilles
Islands of the Caribbean
Islands of the Netherlands Antilles:
Bonaire
Klein Bonaire
Curaçao
Klein Curaçao
Saba
Sint Eustatius
Sint Maarten, the southern portion of the island of Saint Martin
minor islands:
Camia, Netherlands Antilles
Cow and Calf
Green Island, Netherlands Antilles
Guana Cay
Hen and Chicken
Isla Makuka
Kadoesji
Little Island, Netherlands Antilles
Little Key, Netherlands Antilles
Mal Aborder
Meeuwtje
Mollibeday Rots
Mona Island, Netherlands Antilles
Pelican Island, Netherlands Antilles
Penso, Netherlands Antilles
Rancho, Netherlands Antilles
Sapate Eliand
Willemberg

K
Kingdom of the Netherlands (Koninkrijk der Nederlanden)

L
Lesser Antilles
Lists related to the Netherlands Antilles:
List of airports in the Netherlands Antilles
List of birds of the Netherlands Antilles
List of cities in the Netherlands Antilles
List of countries by GDP (nominal)
List of islands of the Netherlands Antilles
List of Netherlands Antilles-related topics
List of political parties in the Netherlands Antilles
List of rivers of the Netherlands Antilles
List of universities in the Netherlands Antilles
List of volcanoes in the Netherlands Antilles
List of World Heritage Sites in the Netherlands Antilles
Topic outline of the Netherlands Antilles

M
Jossy Mansur, writer
Military of the Netherlands Antilles
Music of the Netherlands Antilles

N
Netherlands Antilles (Nederlandse Antillen)
North America
Northern Hemisphere

O
 Outline of the Netherlands Antilles

P
Papiamento language
Politics of the Netherlands Antilles
Postage stamps and postal history of the Netherlands Antilles
Prime Minister of the Netherlands Antilles

S
Scouting Antiano
Scouting in the Netherlands Antilles
South America
SSS islands

T
Telecommunications in the Netherlands Antilles
Topic outline of the Netherlands Antilles
Transport in the Netherlands Antilles

U
United States-Netherlands Antilles relations

W
Western Hemisphere

Wikipedia:WikiProject Topic outline/Drafts/Topic outline of the Netherlands Antilles
Willemstad on Curaçao – Capital of the Netherlands Antilles

See also

List of Caribbean-related topics
List of international rankings
Lists of country-related topics
Topic outline of geography
Topic outline of North America
Topic outline of South America
Topic outline of the Netherlands Antilles

References

External links

Netherlands Antilles